Christabel Nettey (born June 2, 1991 in Brampton, Ontario) is a Canadian athlete specialising in the long jump. She is a two-time Olympian, 2016 and 2020. She has been to two Commonwealth Games, winning gold at the 2018 edition and bronze at the 2014 edition. She won gold at the 2015 Pan American Games.

Athletic career 
She was a gold medallist at the 2018 Commonwealth Games and the 2015 Pan American Games. She has also won bronze medals at the 2013 Jeux de la Francophonie and the 2014 Commonwealth Games. Nettey placed fourth at the 2015 World Championships in Athletics and was a member of Canada's 2016 Olympic team.

She has indoor and outdoor personal bests of 6.99 metres (indoors at the XL Galan and outdoor at the Prefontaine Classic, both in 2015). Both of these performances were Canadian records.

She attended Arizona State University and competed collegiately for the Arizona State Sun Devils. Her best performance for them was a second-place finish at the NCAA Women's Division I Indoor Track and Field Championship in 2013.

Nettey has qualified to compete at the 2020 Summer Olympics.

Personal life 
Nettey was born in Ontario, Canada to Eustace and Genevieve Nettey who are both from Ghana.

International competitions

Collegiate competitions

References

External links

 
  (archive)
 
 
 
 

Living people
1991 births
Sportspeople from Surrey, British Columbia
Canadian female long jumpers
Olympic female long jumpers
Olympic track and field athletes of Canada
Athletes (track and field) at the 2016 Summer Olympics
Pan American Games gold medalists for Canada
Pan American Games medalists in athletics (track and field)
Pan American Games track and field athletes for Canada
Athletes (track and field) at the 2015 Pan American Games
Athletes (track and field) at the 2019 Pan American Games
Commonwealth Games gold medallists for Canada
Commonwealth Games bronze medallists for Canada
Commonwealth Games medallists in athletics
Athletes (track and field) at the 2014 Commonwealth Games
Athletes (track and field) at the 2018 Commonwealth Games
World Athletics Championships athletes for Canada
Arizona State Sun Devils women's track and field athletes
Canadian people of Ghanaian descent
Black Canadian female track and field athletes
Canadian Track and Field Championships winners
Commonwealth Games gold medallists in athletics
Competitors at the 2013 Summer Universiade
Medalists at the 2015 Pan American Games
Athletes (track and field) at the 2020 Summer Olympics
Medallists at the 2014 Commonwealth Games
Medallists at the 2018 Commonwealth Games